Classic Masters is a compilation album of songs by rock group Crowded House, released in 2003.

This album was only released to the American market and focuses more on songs that were popular in America than the songs on the international release Recurring Dream: The Very Best of Crowded House.

Critical reception
AllMusic writer Stephen Thomas Erlewine criticized that the compilation album contained such a large percentage of obscure singles, album songs, and rare tracks. 
Erlewine said the collection, "while listenable, is far from their classic work, and pales dramatically in comparison to Recurring Dream." 
Gregg Shapiro of Windy City Times was more favorable, stating that the collection was worthwhile thanks to the album's two live recordings, "When You Come" and "Sister Madly".

Track listing
All songs were written by Neil Finn, except where noted.

"Something So Strong" (N. Finn, Mitchell Froom) – 2:52
"Weather with You" (N. Finn, Tim Finn) – 3:44
"When You Come" (Live) – 5:47*
"Don't Dream It's Over" – 3:55
"Fingers of Love" - 4:26
"Nails in My Feet" - 3:39
"Never Be the Same" - 4:28
"Chocolate Cake" (N. Finn, T. Finn) - 4:02
"It's Only Natural" (N. Finn, T. Finn) – 3:32
"Distant Sun" (Remix) – 3:50*
"Sister Madly" (Live) - 2:57*
"Hole in the River" (N. Finn, Eddie Rayner) - 3:56

Note
 *Not available on other albums

References

2003 compilation albums
Crowded House albums
Albums produced by Tchad Blake
Albums produced by Mitchell Froom
Capitol Records compilation albums
Compilation albums by Australian artists